Teodor II Muzaka was member of the Muzaka family, Albanian nobles who ruled the Principality of Muzaka. He died fighting during the Battle of Kosovo in 1389 on the side of the anti-Ottoman coalition led by Lazar of Serbia.

Life

Theodor Muzaka came from the noble Muzaka family, who were wealthy in central Albania. In 1372 Theodor succeeded his late father in the Principality of Muzaka. The capital of the principality, Berat, fell to the Serbs in 1345 together with Valona by the Serbian army leader Kersak. In 1346, John Komnenos Asen, brother-in-law of the Serbian Tsar Stefan Uroš IV Dušan, was appointed governor in Berat. Berat did not to come under the control of the Muzaka family again until 1396.

Between 1383 and 1384, Theodor II, together with his brother Stoya and the monk Dionysius, had a Greek Orthodox church (Church of St. Athanasius of Mouzaki) built in Kastoria, which was dedicated to Athanasius the Great.

Succession

After the death of Theodor II, the rule in the Principality of Muzaka passed over to his nephew Theodor III Muzaka. This could only happen because his only son Nicola must have been dead at the time or was held captive by his aunt Comita Muzaka.

Notes and References 

Notes:

References:

Sources 
 
 

14th-century monarchs in Europe
15th-century monarchs in Europe
History of Berat
14th-century Albanian people
15th-century Albanian people
Teodor II